Robert George "Bob" King (born 13 December 1938) is a politician in Queensland, Australia. He was a Member of the Queensland Legislative Assembly.

Early life

Bob King was born in Ayr, the son of John Leslie King, a radio dealer, and Thelma Annie. He attended Mackay state school and became a school teacher, then a primary producer with International Finance and Automotive Management.

Politics
From 1985 he was deputy chairman of Maroochy Shire Council.

Originally a member of the National Party, he joined the Liberal Party and at the 1989 election was narrowly elected to the Queensland Legislative Assembly as the member for Nicklin. Following a challenge by the defeated National candidate, Neil Turner, a recount was held, which Turner won; King thus ceased to be a member on 22 November 1990. He unsuccessfully contested the seat again in the 1992 election.

References

1938 births
Living people
Liberal Party of Australia members of the Parliament of Queensland
Members of the Queensland Legislative Assembly